Arapatiella is a genus of plants in the family Fabaceae.

It contains the following species:
 Arapatiella emarginata 
 Arapatiella psilophylla

References 

Caesalpinioideae
Fabaceae genera
Taxonomy articles created by Polbot